Animas is an unincorporated community and census-designated place (CDP) in west-central Hidalgo County, New Mexico, United States, in the southwestern corner of the state. As of the 2010 census it had a population of 237.

Although Animas is unincorporated, it has a post office, which opened in 1909, with the ZIP code of 88020.

History
Founded circa 1753 by the Spanish, Animas became part of the newly independent country of Mexico in 1821. Unlike most of New Mexico, Animas was not part of the Mexican Cession after the Mexican–American War ended; it is located in the area sold to the United States with the Gadsden Purchase of 1853.

Geography
Animas is an isolated ranching community. It is located in the valley bounded by the Peloncillo Mountains on the west and the Pyramid Mountains and Animas Mountains on the east. Smaller communities closer to Animas include Cotton City, Playas, and Rodeo. Animas lies in a region rich in Native American history—twenty-one different archeological sites in the Animas area are listed on the National Register of Historic Places.

Climate
Animas has a cool semi-arid climate (Köppen BSk) with hot summers and mild winters.

Demographics

References

External links

Census-designated places in Hidalgo County, New Mexico
Populated places established in 1753
1753 establishments in New Spain
Census-designated places in New Mexico